Chickaloon (Nay’dini’aa Na’ in Ahtna Athabascan; Nuk'din'itnu in Dena'ina) is a census-designated place (CDP) in Matanuska-Susitna Borough, Alaska, United States. It is part of the Anchorage, Alaska Metropolitan Statistical Area.  The population was 254 at the 2020 census, down from 272 in 2010. 

The Alaska Native people of Chickaloon are a mixture of Ahtna and Dena'ina Athabaskan.

On May 31, 2021 a M6.1 Earthquake struck Chickaloon.

Geography
Chickaloon is located at  (61.793994, -148.482733).

Demographics

Chickaloon first appeared on the 1930 U.S. Census as an unincorporated village. It appeared again on the 1940 & 1960 censuses, but was not returned separately in 1950, 1970 & 1980. It returned again beginning in 1990, when it was made a census-designated place.

As of the census of 2000, there were 213 people, 87 households, and 58 families residing in the CDP.  The population density was 2.7 people per square mile (1.0/km2).  There were 208 housing units at an average density of 2.6/sq mi (1.0/km2).  The racial makeup of the CDP was 77.93% White, 1.41% Black or African American, 15.49% Native American, 0.94% Asian, 0.00% Pacific Islander, 1.88% from other races, and 2.35% from two or more races.  1.41% of the population were Hispanic or Latino of any race.

There were 87 households, out of which 31.0% had children under the age of 18 living with them, 58.6% were married couples living together, 3.4% had a female householder with no husband present, and 33.3% were non-families. 25.3% of all households were made up of individuals, and 4.6% had someone living alone who was 65 years of age or older.  The average household size was 2.45 and the average family size was 3.00.

In the CDP, the population was spread out, with 25.4% under the age of 18, 3.3% from 18 to 24, 23.0% from 25 to 44, 41.8% from 45 to 64, and 6.6% who were 65 years of age or older.  The median age was 44 years.  For every 100 females, there were 129.0 males.  For every 100 females age 18 and over, there were 120.8 males.

The median income for a household in the CDP was $49,792, and the median income for a family was $49,792. Males had a median income of $41,827 versus $36,607 for females. The per capita income for the CDP was $14,755.  None of the families and 2.8% of the population were living below the poverty line.

Education 
The Ya Ne Dah Ah School teaches the Ahtna Athabaskan language as a part of its curriculum.

See also

 List of census-designated places in Alaska

References

External links

 State of Alaska community information profile for Chickaloon

Anchorage metropolitan area
Census-designated places in Alaska
Census-designated places in Matanuska-Susitna Borough, Alaska
Mining communities in Alaska
Ahtna
Denaʼina